Ivo-Valentino Tomaš (28 July 1993 – 31 December 2019) was a Croatian professional footballer who played as a midfielder. A former youth international for Croatia and Germany, he died on 31 December 2019 in his home town of Baška Voda.

Club career
Ivo Tomaš was born in Split, and joined Hajduk Split's youth academy in 2005. He first came under media attention when he was called up to the German U-16 national team in 2009, being eligible to play for Germany as his mother is German, not having been capped before for any Croatian selection. He was added to the Hajduk first team by coach Krasimir Balakov in January 2012. He made his debut for the first team in a 1–0 victory over Karlovac on 7 April 2012. He left Hajduk in 2015.

In the summer of 2019, Tomaš rejoined NK Urania Baška Voda for the third time.

Death
On the morning of 31 December 2019, the media and his former club HNK Hajduk Split announced the death of Tomaš, by suicide.

References

External links
Ivo-Valentino Tomaš profile at hajduk.hr

Ivo-Valentino Tomaš at FuPa

1993 births
2019 deaths
Footballers from Split, Croatia
Croatian footballers
Croatia youth international footballers
German footballers
Germany youth international footballers
Croatian people of German descent
German people of Croatian descent
Croatian expatriate footballers
Croatian Football League players
First Football League (Croatia) players
Regionalliga players
HNK Hajduk Split players
NK Dugopolje players
VfB Oldenburg players
SSV Jeddeloh players
SV Babelsberg 03 players
Association football midfielders
Suicides by hanging in Croatia
2019 suicides